Peter Michael Copeland (17 July 1942 – 30 July 2006) was an English sound archivist.

From an early age he had a deep interest in collecting old gramophone records and in sound recording. In 1961 he joined the BBC World Service as a Technical Operator in the Control Room at Bush House, undertaking recording operations on disk and tape as well as Control Room routing. In 1964 he became a Studio Manager - operating studio mixing desks and playback equipment - at Broadcasting House, moving on to the BBC Regional studios at Bristol in 1966 where he eventually became the principal Film Dubbing Mixer, responsible for, among many other things, the final mix on David Attenborough's wildlife series Life on Earth.

During this time he also ran a small disc-cutting business as a sideline under the name Gosport Sound Products (he grew up in Gosport, Hampshire) - initially in his flat at Anerley, South London, and then in a small office in Bristol - doing long-playing disc copies of private recordings such as weddings (this was before the advent of cheap tape and cassette recorders) and disk mastering for subsequent pressings to be made. 

As BBC Bristol was the home of the Natural History Unit, he developed an interest in making birdsong and wildlife recordings: he once paid for a holiday in Australia by recording wildlife atmospheres during it and selling them to the BBC Sound Archive.

In 1986 he left the BBC and took up the post of Conservation Manager and later become the Head of Sound Conservation at the National Sound Archive (now part of the British Library) which essentially performs much the same functions for sound recordings as the Library does for books and other publications. He was instrumental in effecting the move to digital archiving using the new techniques which were becoming available: he also did extensive research into the highly specialised and complex area of accurate reproduction of old recordings - he probably knew more about the technical history of sound recording than anyone in the country.

He retired from the NSA (by then called the British Library Sound Archive) in 2002 on reaching the age of 60, but continued to act as a consultant until his death from a diabetes-related heart attack on 30 July 2006. He was still working on a Manual of Analogue Sound Restoration Techniques - a mammoth opus with sections on conversion to digital formats, noise reduction, correct methods of playing and equalizing 78rpm and other old recordings: the British Library has published this manual electronically on its website. His huge collection of rare and unusual gramophone records and other sound recordings has been donated to the British Library Sound Archive.

Bibliography 
Copeland, Peter. Sound Recordings. London: the British Library, 1991. .
Copeland, Peter, Jeffery Boswall, and Leonard Petts. Birdsongs on Old Records. London: the Authors in association with the British Library of Wildlife Sounds, 1987. .
Copeland, Peter. Memoirs of a Record Collector and Sound Recording Engineer: The Autobiography of Peter Copeland (1942 -2006) Independently published, 2021. . Also available as a Kindle e-book.

References

External links
ARSC Newsletter obituary and appreciations by Nigel Bewley and George Brock-Nannestad, p. 10
References in British Library documents
Article by Prof. Sean Street
BBC Radio 4's "Last Word' - page for edition including a tribute to Copeland.
 - Peter Copeland's autobiography

1942 births
2006 deaths
English archivists
English collectors